Christina Hesselholdt (born 19 December 1962) is a Danish author. She is a cand.phil. in literary studies and also graduated from the Forfatterskolen in Copenhagen in 1990, where she has also taught ever since. She has been co-editor of the literary magazines Banana Split and Den Blå Port.

Christina Hesselholdt has received a number of awards for her work and in 2018 received the Danish Academy's Grand Prize, which is described as the country's most prestigious recognition of an authorship.

Bibliography 
Books for adults
 Køkkenet, gravkammeret & landskabet, Rosinante 1991 (novel)
 Det skjulte, Rosinante 1993 (novel)
 Eks, Munksgaard / Rosinante 1995 (novel)
 Udsigten, Munksgaard / Rosinante 1995 (novel)
 Hovedstolen, Munksgaard / Rosinante 1998 (novel)
 Kraniekassen, Rosinante 2001
 Du, mit du, Rosinante 2003 (novel)
 En have uden ende, Rosinante 2005 (prosatekster)
 I familiens skød, Rosinante 2007 (novel)
 Camilla and the horse, Rosinante 2008 (short story)
 Camilla – og resten af selskabet : en fortællerkreds, Rosinante 2010 (short story)
 Selskabet gør op, Rosinante 2012 (short story)
 Agterudsejlet, Rosinante 2014 (short story)
 Lykkelige familier, Rosinante 2014 (novel)
 Vivian, Rosinante 2016 (novel)

Bøger for børn
 Prinsessen på sandslottet, Høst 1998
 Brandmanden fra før, Høst 1999
 Hjørnet der gik sin vej, Rosinante 2000
 Prinsessen i sommerhuset, Høst 2001
 Onde onkel snegleæder, Høst 2003
 Prinsesse og de halve slotte, Høst 2006
 Den grådige skarv, Høst 2007
 Det gale kattehus, Høst 2007
 Værelse uden nøgle, Dansklærerforeningen 2008
 Prinsessen på sandslottet og andre historier, Høst 2008
 Hr. Andrés vanvidsnat, Høst 2009
 Grotten, Dansklærerforeningen 2010

Texts in other languages
 Die Fiktionen einer Kindheit i Muschelhaufen. Jahresschrift für Literatur und Grafik. Nr. 39/40-2000

References

Danish writers
1962 births
Living people